Clarges may refer to:

People
 Clarges baronets, extant from 1674 to 1834
 Robert Clarges (fl. 1713–1716), English Tory MP for Reading
 Thomas Clarges (disambiguation), multiple people, including:
Thomas Clarges (died 1695), English politician
Sir Thomas Clarges, 2nd Baronet (1688–1759), MP for Lostwithiel
Sir Thomas Clarges, 3rd Baronet (1751–1782), MP for Lincoln
 Verner Clarges (1846–1911), American actor of the silent era
 Sir Walter Clarges, 1st Baronet (1653–1705/6), English Tory politician

Other uses
 Clarges Street, street in the City of Westminster, London
 To Live Forever (novel), 1956 science-fiction novel retitled Clarges